Peixoto Dam, also known as Mascarenhas de Moraes Hydroelectric Plant, is a hydroelectric dam on the Grande River in the state of Minas Gerais, Brazil, about  west of Delfinópolis.

Studies for a dam at the Peixoto site were first carried out in 1947 by the Companhia Paulista de Força e Luz, which obtained rights to develop the site in 1950. The dam was built between 1952 and 1957 with help from the United States and the dam dedicated on April 30, 1957 by Brazilian President Juscelino Kubitschek. Since 1973, the dam and hydroelectric power plant have been operated by Eletrobras Furnas. Peixoto was the first of a cascade of nine dams to be built on the Grande River.

The  power station is located on the south side of the dam and consists of ten vertical Francis turbines.

Water is released from the dam through the power plant and two spillways.

See also

List of power stations in Brazil

References

Dams in Minas Gerais
Dams completed in 1957
Gravity dams
Dams on the Rio Grande (Paraná River tributary)